Len Cunning (November 1, 1950 – July 3, 2020) was an ice hockey player who played for the Johnstown Jets of the Eastern Hockey League. His career ended in one game after taking a skate to the face.

Life facts
Len was born November 1, 1950, in Edmonton, Alberta. He was 6.03 feet tall and weighed 195 pounds. In his career, he shot left handed.

1970-1971 season 
(Games Played: 69)
(Goals: 3)
(Assists: 20)
(Points: 23)
( PIM: 78)

Cunning faced John Van Horlick of the Checkers December 8, 1970. It was not proven who won the fight.

1971-1972 season
(Games Played: 71)
(Goals: 6)
(Assists: 21)
(Points: 27)
(PIM: 70)

References

1950 births
2020 deaths
Canadian ice hockey players
Johnstown Jets players
Ice hockey people from Edmonton
Canadian expatriate ice hockey players in the United States